3D EP (stylised as 3D • EP) is the debut record by English rock band XTC, released on 7 October 1977 through Virgin Records. The songs were recorded and mixed at Abbey Road Studios with production and engineering by John Leckie.  "I'm Bugged" and "New Town Animal in a Furnished Cage" were also recorded at these sessions and these versions later appeared on their debut LP White Music (1978). Promotional videos were made for "Science Friction", "She's So Square" and "Dance Band".  These same songs appeared on the White Music CD as bonus tracks.

The Da Capo Companion to 20th-century Popular Music (1995) writes that the album and "particularly its lead track 'Science Friction' set the tone for the early part of XTC's career, with Partridge's fondness for puns (exemplified by the band's name) and both his and Moulding's pop sensibilities to the fore, backed by Andrews' quirky keyboard style."

Track listing

Personnel
Andy Partridge – guitar and vocals
Barry Andrews – piano and organ
Colin Moulding – bass and vocals
Terry Chambers – drums and vocals

References

1977 debut EPs
XTC EPs